Hoheneck Women's Prison (German: Frauengefängnis Hoheneck) was a women's correctional facility in operation between 1862 and 2001 in Stollberg, Germany. It became most notable as a detention facility for female political prisoners in East Germany. The prison was designed to hold up to 600 inmates, however, as many as 1,600 were detained there.

The short film Broken: The Women’s Prison at Hoheneck examines forced labour in Hoheneck Prison.

Notable inmates 
Erika Bergmann: Nazi war criminal and Ravensbrück concentration camp guard

Ulla Jürß: Nazi war criminal and Ravensbrück concentration camp guard

Erna Petri: Nazi war criminal

Jutta Fleck: Attempted escapee from the German Democratic Republic

See also
 Berlin-Hohenschönhausen Memorial
 Memorial and Education Centre Andreasstrasse

References

Further reading 
 Rodewill, Rengha (2014) Hoheneck – Das DDR-Frauenzuchthaus: Dokumentarische Erkundung in Fotos mit Zeitzeugenberichten und einem Vorwort von Katrin Göring-Eckardt. Berlin: Vergangenheitsverlag 

Defunct prisons in Germany
1862 establishments in Germany
2001 disestablishments in Germany
Women's prisons
Stasi
History of East Germany
Penal labour